Korovino is a rural locality (a selo) in Volokonovsky District, Belgorod Oblast, Russia. The population was 257 as of 2010. There are 3 streets.

Geography 
Korovino is located 15 km north of Volokonovka (the district's administrative centre) by road. Novoivanovka is the nearest rural locality.

References 

Rural localities in Volokonovsky District